Christopher S. Warner (born 1969) is an American Anglican bishop. He is the second bishop of the Anglican Diocese of the Mid-Atlantic (DOMA), prior to which he served as a priest in the Anglican Diocese of South Carolina.

Early life, education, and family

Warner was born in 1969 in Pueblo, Colorado. He was baptized in the Catholic Church but did not grow up attending church. In high school and college, Warner became a Deadhead and followed the Grateful Dead on East Coast tours. He has said that he became fearful of "demonic" presences at Grateful Dead concerts. During a Dead concert at RFK Stadium in Washington, D.C., Warner left the stadium and prayed for conversion.

Warner graduated from the University of North Carolina at Wilmington in 1991. After college, he began discernment for ordained ministry and served as a youth pastor at St. Margaret's Episcopal Church in Charlotte. In 1993, he married his wife, Catherine, and they have three adult children. In 1997, after working in the financial sector at Bank of America and Broadway and Seymour, Warner enrolled in Trinity School for Ministry.

Ordained ministry

Pittsburgh Bishop Robert Duncan ordained Warner to the diaconate in 2000 upon his graduation from Trinity. He was ordained to the priesthood the following year. He served from 2000 to 2002 as curate at Trinity Episcopal Church in Columbus, Georgia. From 2002 to 2007, he was associate rector at the Church of the Holy Cross in Sullivan's Island, South Carolina, where he developed a men's hiking ministry that has expanded throughout the Diocese of South Carolina and assisted with the launch of a second campus in Daniel Island.

In 2007, Warner was appointed rector of St. Christopher Camp and Conference Center on Seabrook Island. The camp is a 300-acre retreat center then owned by the Episcopal Diocese of South Carolina. The role included spiritual oversight of the camp and conference center programs (including summer camps, a barrier island environmental education program and diocesan and church conferences) plus oversight of 60 employees. He chose to leave St. Christopher's in 2011. With the rift between the Diocese of South Carolina and the Episcopal Church portending future litigation over diocesan properties, Warner has said that "[n]ecessarily, St. Christopher would be stewarded through management rather than visionary growth. After much prayer, I realized my gift mix was better suited elsewhere." (In 2022, St. Christopher's was returned to the Episcopal Diocese of South Carolina under a final settlement.)

Warner returned to Holy Cross as an associate priest and in 2015 was appointed rector of the multisite congregation with a ministry staff of 22 plus two preschool programs at its two campuses. During his rectorate, Holy Cross paid down $1.5 million in building debt from prior expansions. He also shifted Holy Cross from a "seeker-sensitive" model to a "relational and discipleship model" for church life.

In the late 2010s, Warner has said that he was encouraged to consider episcopal ministry by ANiC Suffragan Bishop Trevor Walters and Bishop Mark Lawrence. He was a finalist in the election for the 15th bishop of South Carolina in which Chip Edgar was elected. In October 2022, Warner was elected the second bishop of the Diocese of the Mid-Atlantic to succeed John Guernsey. Following consent from the ACNA College of Bishops, Warner was consecrated as a bishop by Foley Beach and 25 other ACNA bishops on February 18, 2023, at the Falls Church Anglican. During the same service, he was invested as the diocese's second bishop.

References

External links
Profile on Anglican Diocese of the Mid-Atlantic website

1969 births
Living people
Christians from South Carolina
Bishops of the Anglican Church in North America
University of North Carolina at Wilmington alumni